Ajai Pal Singh (born 20 March 1969) is an Indian politician and former Member in the Uttar Pradesh Legislative Assembly. He was a MLA from Dalmau Vidhan Sabha Seat from 2007 until 2012.

References

People from Raebareli
1969 births
Living people
Colvin Taluqdars' College alumni
Uttar Pradesh MLAs 2007–2012
University of Lucknow alumni